Maccabi Avishai Motzkin, is a handball club from the city of Kiryat Motzkin, Israel. competes in the Ligat Winner Big. it is the Israeli first division.

The club was established in 1960. In most years of its existence, the team is based on the players Who grew up in a club. The club also operates a large junior's department.

2000/01 season the team participated in the European Cup groups
And lost in two meetings total to the Team of "Dennis Turko" from Finland.

2010/11 season, the team came up to the State Cup Semifinal, and lost to Hapoel Rishon LeZion.
 
The team's colors are Blue and Yellow, and it hosts its home games in Moshe Goshen Sport Hall in Kiryat Motzkin.

Notable players roster
  Oren Meirovitch
  Itai Goshen (Captain)
  Alon Cohen
  Vladi Cofman
  Maor Afuta
  Yariv Rinkov
  Roman Giorgi
  Bratislav Stanković
  Nenad Mandić
  Dušan Bozoljac
  Aleksandar Bosić
  Miralem Bećirović
  Igor Radojević
  Filip Leovać

External links
 Team Profile in the Israeli Handball Association (He)

Israeli handball clubs
Handball clubs established in 1960
Krayot
1960 establishments in Israel